The Railway Village Historic District is a historic district encompassing a densely populated, predominantly residential, area of eastern Milton, Massachusetts.  The  district lies roughly between East Milton Square and the town line with neighboring Quincy.  The area's significant growth occurred after the 1826 construction of the Granite Railway, which transported stone from the nearby granite quarries to the Neponset River.  This resulted in the movement to the area of stone workers and related interests.  The principal thoroughfare of the district is Adams Street; the district extends along Pierce Street, Granite Place, and Washington Street, and includes properties on intervening and connecting streets.

The district was listed on the National Register of Historic Places in 2000.

See also
National Register of Historic Places listings in Milton, Massachusetts

References

Historic districts in Norfolk County, Massachusetts
Milton, Massachusetts
National Register of Historic Places in Milton, Massachusetts
Historic districts on the National Register of Historic Places in Massachusetts